Gary Setchell (born 8 May 1975) is an English former professional footballer who is the manager of Corby Town After retiring from playing, he also managed other non-league clubs King's Lynn Town and Wisbech Town.

Career

In July 2015 Setchell was appointed full-time General Manager of King's Lynn Town to help build links between the club and local community.

In October 2015 he reached his 300th game as manager of King's Lynn Town.

Setchell was sacked as King's Lynn Town manager on 21 February 2017, having been in charge of the club for a total of 384 matches. During almost seven years as manager he had overseen two promotions, as well as taking King's Lynn to the FA Vase Semi Finals in 2010–11 and the last 16 of the FA Trophy in 2012–13.

In September 2017, Setchell was name the new manager of Wisbech Town, returning to the club after seven years. He resigned from the role in May 2019.

On 25 September 2020, Setchell was appointed manager of Bedford Town. However, following a 4–3 home loss to Bromsgrove Sporting in November 2022, Setchell was relieved of his duties having won just one game from the previous seven.

On 7 January 2023, Setchell was appointed as new manager of Corby Town.

References

External links

Gary Setchell career stats at AFCSudbury.com

1975 births
Living people
English footballers
King's Lynn F.C. players
Fakenham Town F.C. players
Kettering Town F.C. players
Rushden & Diamonds F.C. players
Tamworth F.C. players
A.F.C. Sudbury players
Swaffham Town F.C. players
Wisbech Town F.C. players
Association football defenders
Sportspeople from King's Lynn
English Football League players
English football managers
Wisbech Town F.C. managers
King's Lynn Town F.C. managers
Bedford Town F.C. managers
Corby Town F.C. managers